Bolton Lake is a lake in the Mackenzie River drainage basin in northwestern Saskatchewan, Canada. The primary outflow is an unnamed creek to Meanwell Lake, then an unnamed creek into the Mirror River, and then via Clearwater River, Athabasca River, Slave River, and Mackenzie River into the Arctic Ocean.

References

Lakes of Saskatchewan